Rear Admiral Vladimir Konstantinovich Konovalov, Владимир Константинович Коновалов ( – 29 November 1967) was a Soviet Navy distinguished submarine commander during World War II.

Born as Vulf Kalmanovich Konovalov in the village of Nadiyne (Zaporizhzhia Oblast, in what is now Ukraine), His family moved to Donetsk when he was a child. He studied at the Donetsk National Technical University. He joined the Soviet Navy in 1932 and graduated from the M. V. Frunze Higher Naval School in 1936. After graduation, he served on submarines in the Black Sea Fleet. Beginning in October 1940 he transferred to the Baltic Fleet and was appointed second in command of the Soviet submarine L-3, and he was named her commander in March 1943. 

The L-3 was a minelayer submarine, but it was also engaged in offensive operations against German shipping during World War II, ultimately making 11 torpedo attacks under Konovalov's command. 

On April 16, 1945, Konovalov sank the German ship Goya, carrying civilians and military personnel fleeing from the Eastern Front. At least 6,000 people drowned, with only 165 people saved. It was one of the worst maritime disasters ever. According to some versions, the L-3 also might have sunk a small 1411 GRT ship on January 31, 1945, but it is not confirmed. 

Konovalov's submarine also laid five mine barrages of 52 mines during the war, one of which sunk a ship Henry Lütgens measuring 1141 GRT on January 29, 1945. A torpedo boat T34 was also possibly sunk on mines laid by the L-3, on November 20, 1944. 

He was awarded the honorary title of Hero of the Soviet Union for an exemplary wartime record on July 8, 1945.

From May 1946 to November 1947, he commanded the N-27 (formerly the German Type XXI U-Boat U-3515). In 1950, he graduated from the Voroshilov staff college and from 1958 commanded the submarine brigade of the Baltic Fleet. He was made a rear admiral on May 7, 1966, but died of a stroke in Leningrad the following year.

Over the course of his career, Konovalov was awarded the Order of Lenin (three times), the Order of Ushakov 2nd class, the Order of the Patriotic War 1st class (twice), and the Order of the Red Star (twice).

In the book and subsequent film The Hunt for Red October, the fictional Soviet Alfa class nuclear-powered attack submarine is named the V.K. Konovalov.

Honours and awards
 Hero of the Soviet Union
 Three Orders of Lenin
 Order of the Red Banner, twice
 Order of Ushakov, 2nd class
 Order of the Patriotic War, 1st class
 Order of the Red Star
 Medal "For the Defence of Leningrad"
 Medal "For the Victory over Germany in the Great Patriotic War 1941–1945"
 Jubilee Medal "Twenty Years of Victory in the Great Patriotic War 1941-1945"
 Jubilee Medal "30 Years of the Soviet Army and Navy"
 Jubilee Medal "40 Years of the Armed Forces of the USSR"

References 
 
 Mark Shteinberg, "Evrei v voinakh tysiachiletii." Moscow, Jerusalem: Gesharim, 2005, p. 302.
Biography in Russian
Vladimir Konovalov, at Yad Vashem website

1911 births
1967 deaths
Jews from the Russian Empire
Heroes of the Soviet Union
People from Zaporizhzhia Oblast
Recipients of the Order of Lenin
Recipients of the Order of the Red Star
Recipients of the Order of the Red Banner
Recipients of the Order of Ushakov, 2nd class
Soviet admirals
Soviet Jews
Soviet Jews in the military
Soviet military personnel of World War II
Soviet submarine commanders
Ukrainian Jews
N. G. Kuznetsov Naval Academy alumni
Military Academy of the General Staff of the Armed Forces of the Soviet Union alumni